The 2012–13 Winthrop Eagles men's basketball team represented Winthrop University during the 2012–13 NCAA Division I men's basketball season. The Eagles, led by first year head coach Pat Kelsey, played their home games at the Winthrop Coliseum and were members of the South Division of the Big South Conference. They finished the season 14–17, 6–10 in Big South play to finish in fifth place in the South Division. They lost in the quarterfinals of the Big South tournament to Charleston Southern.

Roster

Schedule

|-
!colspan=9| Regular season

|-
!colspan=9| 2013 Big South Conference men's basketball tournament

References

Winthrop Eagles men's basketball seasons
Winthrop
Winthrop Eagles
Winthrop Eagles